Zgornja Kostrivnica is a settlement in the Municipality of Rogaška Slatina in eastern Slovenia. The wider area around Rogaška Slatina is part of the traditional region of Styria. It is now included in the Savinja Statistical Region.

Mass grave
Zgornja Kostrivnica is the site of a mass grave associated with the Second World War. The Cemetery Mass Grave is located in a grassy area in the southwest part of the village cemetery. It contains the remains of 17 people.

Church
The parish church in the settlement is dedicated to the Virgin of Częstochowa. It was built in 1786.

References

External links

Zgornja Kostrivnica on Geopedia

Populated places in the Municipality of Rogaška Slatina